Styloptygma jaculum is a species of sea snail, a marine gastropod mollusk in the family Pyramidellidae, the pyrams and their allies.

Description
The white sharp-pointed shell has a length of 8 mm. The teleoconch contains 11 straight and smooth whorls. These a very slightly channeled at the sutures. The aperture is oblique. The outer lip is simple; The columella is once plaited.

Distribution
This species occurs in the Pacific Ocean off the Loyalty Islands.

References

 Higo, S. & Goto, Y. (1993) A Systematic List of Molluscan Shells from the Japanese Is. and the Adjacent Area. Elle Scientific Publications, Yao, Japan, xxii + 693 + 13 + 149 pp. page(s): 372

External links
 World Register of Marine Species

Pyramidellidae
Gastropods described in 1896